Puruk Cahu (abbreviated: PRC) is the regency seat of Murung Raya Regency and also one of the towns in Central Kalimantan. This town is at a distance of 322 km northeast of Palangka Raya city, the capital of Central Kalimantan Province. The area of this town mainly includes two sub-districts in the district of Murung i.e. the sub-district of Beriwit and the sub-district of Puruk Cahu itself. The population of this town is approximately 21,781 people as of 2021.

Geography 

To be precise, the town of Puruk Cahu is located at 0.6384 S and 114.5677 E. Puruk Cahu is located at the northern to northeastern part of Central Kalimantan and approximately at a distance of 319 km from Palangka Raya city, the capital of Central Kalimantan. Puruk Cahu is also the most northern town and regency seat in the whole Central Kalimantan province. The total area of Puruk Cahu town is about 191 km² which makes it 0.81% of the total area of Murung Raya Regency which is the largest regency in Central Kalimantan. The whole area of this town consists of two sub-districts in Murung district i.e. the sub-district of Beriwit and the sub-district of Puruk Cahu itself.

Puruk Cahu is crossed by one of the most important rivers in Borneo, Barito River. This town is situated on a hilly land at the northeastern portion of Central Kalimantan. The altitude of this town is actually varied between 70 to 300 metres above sea level. Due to its proximity to the equator, Puruk Cahu experiences tropical equatorial climate (Af) with constant high humidity and warm-to-hot temperature, and also huge amounts of rainfall all year long.

Demographics 
As of 2021, the population of Puruk Cahu town is about 21,781 inhabitants which represents 54.3% of the population of Murung district and 19.5% of the entire population of Murung Raya Regency. The population density of this town is approximately 144.2/km². This town has 6,648 households and the average household size is 3.27 people. The sex ratio of this town is 103 which means there are 103 males to every 100 females. The majority of the town's population identify as Muslims (78.7%) and the minority identify as Christians (20.8%), Hindu/Kaharingan (0.45%), and Buddhists (0.05%).

Education 
Puruk Cahu has currently thirteen primary schools (nine public schools and four private schools), seven middle schools (four public schools and three private schools), and five high schools (three public schools and two public schools) as of 2021.

Facilities 
For healthcare facility, Puruk Cahu currently has one general hospital, two public health centres, and four pharmacies. For economic & trade facility, this town recently has three markets, five banks, three shopping complexes, five convenience shops, twenty restaurants, nine food stalls/cafes, six hotels, and eight inns. For religious facility, Puruk Cahu has 37 Islamic religious facilities, seventeen Protestant churches, and one Catholic church.

Reference 

Populated places in Central Kalimantan
Regency seats of Central Kalimantan
Murung Raya Regency